Eduardo "Edu" García Martín (born 24 April 1990) is a Spanish professional footballer who plays as a winger or an attacking midfielder for China League One club Sichuan Jiuniu. He has played in a host of different countries, including China, India and his native Spain.

Club career
García was born in Zaragoza, Aragon, García joined Real Zaragoza's youth setup in 2002, aged 12, after spells at CN Helios Fútbol and UD Amistad. He made his debut with the former's reserves during the 2009–10 campaign, in Tercera División.

In 2012, García rejected a contract extension from the Maños and signed for CD Ebro also in the fourth division. The following year, he moved to fellow league team SD Ejea, along with former Ebro manager José Luis Loreto.

In July 2014, García and his manager Loreto returned to Ebro. He scored a career-best 16 goals during his first season, which ended in promotion to Segunda División B, and added a further eight in his second.

On 10 August 2016, García returned to Zaragoza, signing a two-year contract now with the first team. He made his professional debut on 7 September, starting in a 1–2 Copa del Rey home loss against Real Valladolid.

García made his Segunda División debut on 17 September 2016, replacing Jordi Xumetra in a 2–0 home win against AD Alcorcón. He scored his first goal in the category on 13 November, netting the last in a home success over CD Mirandés for the same scoreline.

Indian Super League

Bengaluru FC
On 3 September 2017, García signed a one-year contract with Indian Super League club Bengaluru FC. On 19 November 2017, he made his first team debut against Mumbai City FC, scoring the first goal in the 2–0 victory and dedicated the goal to the club's assistant manager Carles Cuadrat. On 9 February 2018, he scored in his final match for the club in a 2–0 win over Goa.

China League One

Zhejiang Energy Greentown FC 
On 23 February 2018, he joined Chinese club Zhejiang Energy Greentown for an undisclosed fee. On 24 March 2018, he made his debut for the club in a 2–1 loss over Zhejiang Yiteng. He scored his first goal for the club, on 1 April 2018 against Shanghai Shenxin.  He made his final appearance for the club on 19 September 2018 against Wuhan Zall. He went on to make 15 appearances for the club scoring 3 goals in the process.

Return to the ISL

ATK 
On 23 December 2018, García returned to the Indian Super League with ATK during the January transfer window. On 25 January 2019, he scored a free-kick on his debut in a 1–1 draw against Kerala Blasters. He scored three goals in eight appearances for ATK in his first short season. In his second season with the club, he came on as a substitute and scored a brace against Hyderabad. On 14 March 2020, he scored a goal in the final against Chennaiyin FC to win his first career league title. He finished the season with 6 goals in 16 appearances for the club.

ATK Mohun Bagan 
On 6 August 2020, Garcia signed a two-year contract with newly merged ATK Mohun Bagan. On 20 November 2020, he made his debut for the club against Kerala Blasters in a 1–0 win. He was injured for most of the season and his contract was mutually terminated by the club.

Return to China League One

Sichuan Jiuniu 
Hernán joined Sichuan Jiuniu on 21 April 2022.

Career statistics

Clubs

Honours
ATK
Indian Super League: 2019–20

Notes

References

External links

1990 births
Living people
Footballers from Zaragoza
Spanish footballers
Association football wingers
China League One players
Segunda División players
Segunda División B players
Tercera División players
Real Zaragoza B players
CD Ebro players
SD Ejea players
Real Zaragoza players
Bengaluru FC players
Zhejiang Professional F.C. players
Sichuan Jiuniu F.C. players
Spanish expatriate footballers
Spanish expatriate sportspeople in India
Expatriate footballers in India
Spanish expatriate sportspeople in China
Expatriate footballers in China
ATK (football club) players
Indian Super League players
ATK Mohun Bagan FC players
Hyderabad FC players